Edward "Teddy" Symes (born August 31, 1981) is a producer, director, art curator, and founder of Here and Now Films and Frontrunner Magazine.

His 2008 documentary, Los Medicos, followed a US medical team working in a public hospital in rural Guatemala.  Faced with a crowd of more than a thousand, and only one week to help, the film captures the humanitarian ideal as it collides head on with the scope of need and the complex nature of giving.  The film premiered at the Jackson Hole Film Festival.

He began his career as an assistant to Academy Award-winning documentary producer Grace Guggenheim and then continued on to work as assistant editor for CBS News in New York City.  After leaving CBS, he focused his efforts towards online video, web design, and internet distribution, ultimately creating online content for the United Nations Development Programme and Project Hope.

As a cinematographer Symes worked on the global music project 1 Giant Leap documenting music contributions by Boots Riley, Michael Stipe, Eugene Hutz, Baaba Maal, Jhelisa Anderson, Haale, Miles Solay, and Speech. Interviews for the film included Earle Sebastian, Daniel Pinchbeck, and Anthony Lappe among others.  Symes was also a cinematographer on Tribeca Film Festival experimental documentary Nocturnity by filmmaker Alexandra Liveris.

In 2007, he created short documentaries for various non-profits working domestically as well as internationally in Rwanda, Ethiopia, and Guatemala often collaborating with filmmaker Michael Fasciano.  Their documentaries Stop and Think, Rest When You're Dead, and Rebuilding Rwanda aired simultaneously on the broadband and cable networks of Current TV.

Rest When You're Dead, an eight-minute documentary video pod, followed Garth Stewart, a student at Columbia University, as he recounted his experience joining the army, fighting in Iraq as a mortar gunner during the invasion in 2003, and his political ambitions. The piece documents in cinema verite the early stages of a budding politician.

In 2008, he traveled as cameraman with Time magazine reporters covering homeland security contractors and politician Ron Paul for Time.

He earned a degree in English literature from Kenyon College and M.F.A. from Stanford University.

References

Kenyon College alumni
American documentary film directors
American film producers
Living people
1981 births
Stanford University alumni